Branchinecta paludosa is a species of fairy shrimp with a Holarctic distribution.

Distribution
B. paludosa is widely distributed in the Arctic tundra of Eurasia, chiefly above latitudes of 60° north. It reaches its northern limit, 77° north at Ivanov Bay in the Novaya Zemlya archipelago. Further populations exist as far south as the Tatra Mountains on the Polish–Slovakian border at about 49° north. There are scattered records from North America, mostly near the Arctic Ocean.

Life cycle
After hatching, young B. paludosa spend 20–30 days as larvae, before reaching sexual maturity between the end of July and middle of August. They are then reproductive for 35–45 days.

References

Branchiopoda
Crustaceans described in 1788